Bern railway station serves the municipality of Bern, the federal city of Switzerland. Opened progressively between 1858 and 1860, and rebuilt several times since then, it lies on the Olten–Bern and the Lausanne–Bern lines (together forming the line known as the Mittellandlinie in German) and is near the end of the Lötschberg line. The station is owned by the Swiss Federal Railways (SBB CFF FFS). Train services to and from the station are operated by the Swiss Federal Railways, the Bern-Lötschberg-Simplon railway (BLS) and the metre gauge Regionalverkehr Bern-Solothurn (RBS). Trains calling at the station include ICEs, and international trains to Italy.

Bern is the nearest station to the University of Bern in the Länggasse quarter. There is a rooftop terrace on top of the station, accessed by lift from the subway by Platforms 12 and 13, with views over the city and to the Bernese Alps. Access to Bern Airport from the station is normally via rail to Belp station and then by connecting bus, but the first and last buses each day run directly between Bern station and the airport. It has an IATA Airport Code (ZDJ), as American Airlines codeshares on the Swiss Federal Railways service from Zurich Airport in Zürich.

Between 1999 and 2003, the station was renovated and partially redesigned. Presently, the site contains Rail City, a shopping center open for longer opening hours than most other shops in the city, and also on Sundays and public holidays, when most other shops would be close; this is possible as the shop opening laws of the Canton and the city of Bern do not apply to federally-owned real estate. The station has six standard-gauge platforms serving twelve tracks (numbered 1–10 and 12–13) and two meter gauge RBS platforms serving four tracks (numbered 21–24). Curiously, there is no platform 11, but there is a through railway track with no platform face between platforms 10 and 12. The station interchanges with many local bus, tram and trolley bus routes (operated by BERNMOBIL) and regional bus services (operated by PostAuto).

Amid projections of dramatically increasing passenger numbers, plans for a major expansion and development of Bern Station, largely focusing upon new underground areas, were mooted during the 2010s. Swiss Federal Railways, Regional Bern-Solothurn, and the city of Bern are the key backers behind this development. On 26 June 2017, authorisation to proceed with the planned station expansion was issued and construction activity commenced during the following month. The renovated station was expected to be completed by the end of 2025, but was delayed until 2027, and has now been delayed until 2029

History

Early operations

During 1848, in conjunction with various other changes institutes as Switzerland transitioned to a new federal government system, it was declared by the Federal Council that the city of Bern had been selected as the nation's new capital. As a consequence of this decision, Bern experienced a construction boom promptly thereafter; this work was undertaken with the goal of providing the various amenities and local infrastructure in line with its new-found status. Amongst the projects commenced was a sizable railway station, which was built to accommodate the large volume of local, regional, and international traffic which had been anticipated.

Throughout its life, Bern railway station has been the second biggest station in Switzerland. Over the course of time, Bern station has been progressively expanded and new services added. Currently, it forms the central hub for the city's S-Bahn network, as well as being a major interchange providing connections throughout the metropolitan area, covering an area containing in excess of one million people. Reportedly, projections have been produced which anticipate that, by 2030, passenger numbers using the station are set to rise to between 260,000 and 375,000 people per day.

Redevelopment
During the early part of the twenty-first century, a team of Swiss Federal Railways, Regional Bern-Solothurn, and the city of Bern formed for the purpose of further developing Bern Station to better satisfy the needs of the expanding fare-paying members of the public. In accordance with this aim, in the 2010s, a concept emerged for the station's expansion, which encompasses the construction of a new underground station, along with supporting underground and outdoor works, to accommodate the increased demand. Specifically, a new pedestrian underpass was proposed, which is claimed would result in a reduction in the time taken to transfer between the station's platforms; this underpass is not only for access alone, but shall also accommodate various services and retail outlets. This underpass shall also feature two new station entrances at Bubenberg Centre and Länggasse, roughly half of all passengers are expected to use these new entrances.

The new lower station area is planned to accommodate a total of four tracks, which are to be run underneath six individual tracks of the existing station. It shall principally comprise a pair of large underground halls, each being furnished with a single 12 meter-wide central platform and two tracks; the dimensions of these platforms are to be precisely built so to best ease the boarding and unboarding processes from stopping train. Pedestrian access to and from the platforms is to be achieved via both escalators and elevators, allowing for a quick transition to the older platforms where the main line long-distance and S-Bahn services shall continue to stop at, or to exist the station into the city itself.

Various adaptions and changes to both the existing station and its surrounding area are planned. Larger underground car parking areas are to be constructed at Eilgut, as well as underground spaces for the installation of miscellaneous railway systems and emergency access routes. The station's decorative Perron ceiling is to undergo restoration, while various track works and the installation of new signal boxes shall also take place. A considerable emphasis has been placed upon the facility's aesthetics; it is to this end that the south wall of the main station hall, facing towards the Burgerspital building, shall be partially removed, which is envisioned to generate a brighter and friendlier atmosphere within the hall.

On 26 June 2017, official approval was given for the construction of the proposed station expansion. The next month, construction work at the site was initiated. At this point, work on the first phase of the expansion was not anticipated to be completed until the end of 2025. Reportedly, the new station itself is expected to cost CHF614 million ($643 million), while the expansion of associated public amenities has been costed at CHF360 million ($377 million) and supporting traffic measures in the vicinity has a cost of CHF93 million ($97 million); financing is provided by the federal government, city authorities, and Canton. The federal government via infrastructure funds, the city of Bern, and Canton will provide most of the financing. As originally proposed, the expansion is set to be performed across two individual phases of work; the first phase shall include the construction of the new underground station area and the pedestrian underpass. Work on expanding the station's footprint outwards at its sides shall be performed in the  second stage, which is anticipated to be done by 2035.

Services

 the following services stop at Bern:

Most northbound trains terminate in Basel; a single EuroCity continues to Hamburg-Altona, and two ICEs continue to Berlin Ostbahnhof.
 InterCity:
 InterRegio:
 RegioExpress:
 hourly service to Lucerne.
 Bern S-Bahn:
 : rush-hour service between Biel/Bienne and Belp.

See also

History of rail transport in Switzerland
Rail transport in Switzerland

References

Further reading

External links
 
 

Railway stations in Switzerland opened in 1860
Buildings and structures in Bern
Railway stations in the canton of Bern
Regionalverkehr Bern-Solothurn stations
Swiss Federal Railways stations